Ekspress-AM4R ( meaning Express-AM4R)  was a Russian communications satellite intended for operation by the Russian Satellite Communications Company (RSCC). Constructed as a replacement for Ekspress-AM4, which was left unusable after the upper stage of the launch vehicle carrying it malfunctioned, Ekspress-AM4R was also lost due to a launch failure.

Satellite description 
Astrium, which had become part of Airbus Defence and Space by the time of the satellite's launch, constructed Ekspress-AM4R, which was based on the Eurostar-3000 satellite bus. The satellite carried sixty-three transponders: thirty operating in the C-band of the electromagnetic spectrum, twenty eight in the Ku-band, two in the Ka-band and three in the L-band. It was to have been the largest and most powerful satellite in the Ekspress constellation.

Launch 
Khrunichev State Research and Production Space Center was contracted to launch Ekspress-AM4R, using a Proton-M / Briz-M launch vehicle - the same configuration that had failed to deploy Ekspress-AM4. The launch took place from Site 200/39 at the Baikonur Cosmodrome, at 21:42:00 UTC on 15 May 2014. Shortly after launch the launch vehicle was reported to have encountered a problem during third stage flight, and as a result the satellite failed to reach orbit.

References 

Spacecraft launched in 2014
Satellite launch failures
Ekspress satellites
2014 in Russia
Satellites using the Eurostar bus